Zazdrość may refer to the following places:

Places
Zazdrość, Nakło County in Kuyavian-Pomeranian Voivodeship (north-central Poland)
Zazdrość, Wyszków County in Masovian Voivodeship (east-central Poland)
Zazdrość, Żyrardów County in Masovian Voivodeship (east-central Poland)
Zazdrość, Iława County in Warmian-Masurian Voivodeship (north Poland)
Zazdrość, Gmina Biskupiec in Warmian-Masurian Voivodeship (north Poland)
Zazdrość, Gmina Stawiguda in Warmian-Masurian Voivodeship (north Poland)
Zazdrość, Szczytno County in Warmian-Masurian Voivodeship (north Poland)
Zazdrość, Orzesze in Silesian Voivodeship (south Poland)

Other
 Zazdrość (film), a 1922 Polish silent film